Wyburd is a British surname. Notable people with the surname include:

Francis John Wyburd (1826–1909),  British artist
Leonard Wyburd (1865–1958), British painter, interior designer, and furniture designer

Surnames of British Isles origin